Nicholas Kabasilas or Cabasilas (born 1319/1323 in Thessalonica; died 1392) was a Byzantine mystic and theological writer.

Kabasilas is a saint within the Eastern Orthodox Church. His feast day is June 20. The Roman Catholic Church uses extracts from his Life in Christ as readings in the Liturgy of the Hours (Tuesday, Wednesday, and Thursday of the Fifth Week of Easter in Year II of the provisional two-year cycle for the Office of Readings).

Life
He was on intimate terms with the emperor John VI Kantakouzenos, whom he accompanied in his retirement to a monastery. He was once thought to have succeeded his uncle Neilos Kabasilas as archbishop of Thessalonica; however, contemporary records of that see do not show Nicholas as serving in the capacity of archbishop. It is more likely that he served as a priest at the Mangana Monastery at Constantinople.

In the Hesychast controversy he took the side of the monks of Mount Athos and Saint Gregory Palamas.

Works
His chief work is his  ("On the Life in Christ"), in which he lays down the principle that union with Christ is effected by the three great mysteries of baptism, chrismation, and the eucharist. Kabasilas' Commentary on the Divine Liturgy displays a profound understanding of the sacramental and liturgical life of the Eastern Orthodox Church. He also wrote homilies on various subjects, and a speech against usurers, printed with other works in Migne, Patrologia Graeca, c. i. A large number of his works are still extant in manuscript.

Bibliography
 Cabasilas, N. Commentary on the Divine Liturgy. 14th century. Translated by J.M. Hussey and P.A. McNulty. St. Vladimir's Seminary Press, 1960. 
 Cabasilas, N. The Life in Christ. St. Vladimir's Seminary Press, 1974.

See also
Orthodox views of the Immaculate Conception dogma

Notes

References

Further reading

External links
Encyclopædia Britannica: Nicholas Cabasilas
Nektarios Mamalougos: Nicholas Cabasilas

14th-century births
1392 deaths
Byzantine theologians
Byzantine saints of the Eastern Orthodox Church
14th-century Byzantine people
14th-century writers
Greek religious writers
Byzantine Thessalonian writers
Byzantine bishops of Thessalonica
14th-century Christian mystics
14th-century Christian saints
Saints of medieval Macedonia
Saints of medieval Greece
Eastern Orthodox mystics
Nicholas
14th-century Byzantine writers
14th-century Eastern Orthodox theologians